Mesgaran may refer to:
 Mesgaran, Tus, Mashhad County, Razavi Khorasan Province
 Mesgaran, South Khorasan